Mario Gosselin may refer to:

 Mario Gosselin (ice hockey) (born 1963), Canadian former ice hockey goaltender
 Mario Gosselin (racing driver) (born 1971), Canadian racing driver

See also
 Mario (disambiguation)
 Gosselin (disambiguation)